The Kalamazoo–Portage Metropolitan Area comprises a region surrounding Kalamazoo. 2015 estimates placed it as the 151st largest among similarly designated areas in the United States. 2015 estimates place the combined statistical area 85th among similarly designated areas.

Definitions

The Kalamazoo–Portage Metropolitan Area is a United States metropolitan area defined by the federal Office of Management and Budget (OMB) consisting of Kalamazoo in western Michigan, anchored by the cities of Kalamazoo and Portage, located in Kalamazoo. As of the 2020 census, the Metropolitan Statistical Area (MSA) had a population of 261,670.

The Kalamazoo–Battle Creek–Portage Combined Statistical Area ties for 3rd largest CSA in the U.S. state of Michigan. As of the 2010 census, the CSA had a population of 524,030. The CSA combines the two population centers of Kalamazoo and Battle Creek. It includes the two counties of the Kalamazoo–Portage Metropolitan Statistical Area plus one metropolitan area, Battle Creek in Calhoun County and one micropolitan area, Sturgis in St. Joseph County.

Cities and towns

Places with 25,000 to 100,000 inhabitants
 Kalamazoo
 Battle Creek
 Portage

Places with 5,000 to 25,000 inhabitants
 Albion
 Antwerp Township
 Bedford Charter Township
 Comstock Charter Township
 Cooper Township
 Emmett Charter Township
 Kalamazoo Charter Township
 Marshall
 Oshtemo Township
 Pavilion Township
 Paw Paw Township
 Pennfield Charter Township
 Richland Township
 Ross Township
 Schoolcraft Township
 Springfield
 Texas Township

Demographics
As of the census of 2000, there were 314,866 people, 121,461 households, and 78,270 families residing within the MSA. The racial makeup of the MSA was 85.38% White, 8.64% African American, 0.54% Native American, 1.46% Asian, 0.03% Pacific Islander, 1.80% from other races, and 2.16% from two or more races. Hispanic or Latino of any race were 3.79% of the population.

The median income for a household in the MSA was $40,694, and the median income for a family was $49,889. Males had a median income of $37,464 versus $26,514 for females. The per capita income for the MSA was $19,809.

References

 
Geography of Kalamazoo County, Michigan
Geography of Van Buren County, Michigan
West Michigan